Paul Michael Hartloff (born April 5, 1958) is an American former competition swimmer who represented the United States at the 1976 Summer Olympics in Montreal, Quebec.  Hartloff competed in the men's 1,500-meter freestyle event and finished seventh in the final with a time of 15:32.08.

References

1958 births
Living people
American male freestyle swimmers
Olympic swimmers of the United States
Swimmers from Berkeley, California
Swimmers at the 1975 Pan American Games
Swimmers at the 1976 Summer Olympics
Pan American Games silver medalists for the United States
Pan American Games medalists in swimming
Medalists at the 1975 Pan American Games
20th-century American people